Area code 207 is the sole telephone area code in the North American Numbering Plan (NANP) for the U.S. state of Maine. Area code 207 was created as one of the original North American area codes in 1947. The numbering plan area retains its original boundaries, having never been split or overlaid.

, area code 207 is not threatened by office code exhaustion until the first quarter of 2025. The deadline has been extended several times due to technical changes and number pooling.

Some small Maine communities near the Canadian border are not serviced by area code 207. For example, the northernmost village of Estcourt Station has local routing infrastructure into Canada. It is included in Quebec's 418, 581 and 367 overlay plan.

Central office prefixes 
NOTE: 976 is assigned to Portland.

References

External links

207
207
Telecommunications-related introductions in 1947